Erik Stavås Skistad (born 12 June 2001) is a Norwegian football striker who currently plays for Mjøndalen.

He started his youth career in Konnerud IL. After a time in Strømsgodset's youth ranks he started his senior career in the 4. divisjon with Konnerud in 2019. In the summer of 2020 he trialled with Mjøndalen and was promptly signed by them. He made his Eliteserien debut in November 2020 against Kristiansund.

He is a younger brother of Kristine Stavås Skistad.

References

2000 births
Living people
Sportspeople from Drammen
Norwegian footballers
Mjøndalen IF players
Eliteserien players
Association football forwards